That Tender Age (French: L'Âge ingrat), is a 1964 French comedy film directed by Gilles Grangier that unites two major stars in Jean Gabin and Fernandel. It recounts how two families are drawn together by an engagement between two of their children, are then torn apart when the young couple fall out, and are finally reconciled.

It was shot at the Saint-Maurice Studios in Paris and on location around the city and at Toulon. The film's sets were designed by the art director Jacques Colombier.

Plot
Before parting for the summer vacation, the students Antoine Lartigue and Marie Malhouin decide to get engaged. Marie's father Émile is guarded, but Antoine's father Adolphe is ecstatic and insists that all the Malhouin family must come and stay with his family in his villa at St Tropez. When they arrive, Émile as a phlegmatic Norman finds the endless bonhomie and bragging of the Provençal Adolphe increasingly annoying. His son Antoine also has a fiery Mediterranean temperament, which erupts in a disco when Marie dances with an old flame and Antoine thumps him. Appalled, Marie breaks off the engagement.

Insulted at his son being rejected, Adolphe says more to Émile than he should, upon which Émile packs family and baggage into the car and drives straight back to Paris. One evening Marie does not come home and to try and find her Émile rings everybody he can think of. The phone being constantly busy, Adolphe is unable to contact him. He has come to Paris to try and find Antoine, who has disappeared. When in apprehension he knocks on Émile's door, he gets a frosty reception but at that point Marie rings home to say she is all right and with Antoine.

Cast
 Jean Gabin as Émile Malhouin
 Fernandel as Adolphe Lartigue
 Marie Dubois as Marie Malhouin
 Franck Fernandel as Antoine Lartigue
 Paulette Dubost as Françoise Malhouin
 Claude Mann as Charles-Édouard
 Madeleine Sylvain as Éliane Lartigue 
 Christine Simon as Florence Malhouin
 Henri Rellys as Monsieur Corbidas 
 Franck Cabot-David as Henri Lartigue 
 Andrée Brabant as Femme sur pédalo
 Nicole Courget as Sophie Malhouin 
 Joël Monteilhet as Jules Lartigue
 Yvonne Gamy as Félicie - la bonne
 Georges Rostan as 	Max Lartigue
 Noël Roquevert as L'estivant récalcitrant

References

Bibliography 
 Harriss, Joseph. Jean Gabin: The Actor Who Was France. McFarland, 2018.
 Oscherwitz, Dayna & Higgins, MaryEllen . The A to Z of French Cinema. Scarecrow Press, 2009.

External links
 

1960s French-language films
1964 films
1964 comedy films
French comedy films
Films directed by Gilles Grangier
Films shot at Saint-Maurice Studios
Films set in Paris
Films shot in Paris
1960s French films